{{DISPLAYTITLE:N,N-Diisopropylcarbodiimide}}N,N′-Diisopropylcarbodiimide''' is a carbodiimide used in peptide synthesis. As a liquid, it is easier to handle than the commonly used N,N′-dicyclohexylcarbodiimide, a waxy solid. In addition, N,N′''-diisopropylurea, its byproduct in many chemical reactions, is soluble in most organic solvents, a property that facilitates work-up.

Further reading

Peptide coupling reagents
Carbodiimides
Reagents for biochemistry
Biochemistry
Biochemistry methods
Isopropylamino compounds